The superorder Elopomorpha contains a variety of types of fishes that range from typical silvery-colored species, such as the tarpons and ladyfishes of the Elopiformes and the bonefishes of the Albuliformes, to the long and slender, smooth-bodied eels of the Anguilliformes. The one characteristic uniting this group of fishes is they all have leptocephalus larvae, which are unique to the Elopomorpha. No other fishes have this type of larvae.

Taxonomy
The Elopomorpha are a group of teleost fishes and are separated into several orders.

 Genus †Bullichthys Mayrincka, Britob & Otero 2010
 Genus †Eichstaettia Arratia 1987
 Genus †Eoenchelys Lu 1994
 Genus †Elopomorphorum Weiler ex Martin & Weiler 1954 [Otolith]
 Order Elopiformes Gosline 1960
 Family †Anaethaliidae Gaudant 1968
 Suborder Elopoidei
 Family Protelopidae de Saint Seine 1949
 Family Elopidae Bonaparte 1832/Valenciennes 1847 (tenpounders, ladyfishes)
 Family Megalopidae Jordan 1882 (Tarpons)
 Order Albuliformes Greenwood et al. 1966 sensu Forey et al. 1996
 Family †Phyllodontidae Sauvage 1875 corrig. Jordan 1923
 Family Albulidae Bleeker 1849 (Japanese gissu and bonefishes)
 Order Notacanthiformes Goodrich 1909
 Halosauridae Günther 1868
 Notacanthidae Rafinesque 1810 (Deep sea spiny eels)
 Order Anguilliformes
 Family †Derrhiidae Jordan 1925b
 Family †Libanechelyidae Taverne 2004
 Family †Anguillavidae Hay 1903
 Family †Urenchelyidae Jordan 1905
 Suborder Protanguilloidei
 Family Protanguillidae Johnson, Ida & Miya 2011 (primitive cave eels)
 Suborder Synaphobranchoidei
 Family Synaphobranchidae Johnson 1862 (cutthroat eels)
 Suborder Muraenoidei Risso 1826
 Family †Georgidentidae Sychevskaya & Prokofiev 2003
 Family Pythonichthyidae Böhlke 1966 (mud eels)
 Family Myrocongridae Gill 1890
 Family Muraenidae Rafinesque 1815 (moray eels)
 Suborder Chlopsoidei
 Family Chlopsidae Rafinesque 1815
 Suborder Congroidei Kaup 1856
 Family †Parachelidae Casier 1967
 Family Ophichthidae Günther 1870 (snake eels & worm eels)
 Family Derichthyidae Gill 1884 (longneck eels)
 Family Muraenesocidae Kaup 1859 (pike congers)
 Family Nettastomatidae Kaup 1859 (duckbill eels)
 Family Congridae Kaup 1856 (conger eels)
 Suborder Moringuoidei
 Family Moringuidae Gill 1885
 Suborder Anguilloidei Regan 1909
 Family †Anguilloididae Blot 1978
 Family †Milananguillidae Blot 1978
 Family †Mylomyridae Berg 1940
 Family †Nardoechelyidae Taverne & Capasso 2014
 Family †Paranguillidae Blot 1980
 Family †Patavichthyidae Blot 1981
 Family †Proteomyridae Blot 1980
 Family Nemichthyidae Günther 1870 (snipe eels)
 Family Serrivomeridae Roule 1929 (sawtooth eels)
 Family Anguillidae Rafinesque 1810 (freshwater eels)
 Suborder Saccopharyngoidei Robins 1989
 Family Cyematidae Regan 1912 (bobtail snipe eels)
 Family Saccopharyngidae Bleeker 1859
 Family Eurypharyngidae Gill 1883 (pelican eels, umbrellamouth gulpers)
 Family Monognathidae Bertin 1936 (onejaw gulpers)

References

External links

 
Fish superorders